The women's 800 metres at the 2011 IPC Athletics World Championships was held at the QEII Stadium from 24–29 January 2011.

Medalists

References
Complete Results Book from the 2011 IPC Athletics World Championships
Official site of the 2011 IPC Athletics World Championships

800 metres
2011 in women's athletics
800 metres at the World Para Athletics Championships